The Left Bloc was a Jewish leftwing organization in Mandatory Palestine, which existed in the late 1920s. The group published a newspaper called Derekh Hapoel (דרך הפועל, Hebrew for 'Workers' Path'). Politically, the organization was critical of the Histadrut leadership for not organizing Arabic and Jewish workers jointly.

References

Politics of Mandatory Palestine
Jewish organizations in Mandatory Palestine